Le Jingyi (born March 19, 1975, in Shanghai) is a former swimmer from China who won the gold medal in the 100 metres freestyle at the 1996 Summer Olympics in Atlanta, USA.

In 1992, Le won the silver medal in the 4×100 metres freestyle relay (3:40.12) at the 1992 Summer Olympics in Barcelona, and also finished 6th in the 100 m free (55.89).  In 1993 she defeated her teammate, Olympic champion Zhuang Yong, to become national champion in the 100 m free (54.72, 2nd globally after Franziska van Almsick).  In December 1993, she won 4 golds, all in world record times, at the 1st ever World Short Course Championships in Spain (50 m free: 24.23; 100 m free: 53.01; 4×100 m free relay: 3:35.97 and 4×100 m medley reply: 3:57.73).

She won the title in the 100 metres freestyle at the 1994 World Aquatics Championships in Rome, setting a world record with a time of 54.01 seconds.  She also set a world record in the 50 metres freestyle (24.51) and anchored two world record-setting relays.  She also won 3 golds in the 1995 Short Course Worlds in Brazil.

At the Atlanta Olympics, she won the 100 m freestyle (54.50) and won silver medals in the 4×100 metres freestyle relay (3:40.48) and the 50 metres freestyle (24.90).

Le continued to compete in 1997, winning the 50 m freestyle (25.24) and taking silver in the 10 0m (54.86) and 200 m (2:00.54) at the Pan Pacific Championships.  At the 1997 Chinese National Games, she was upset by Shan Ying in the 50 m (24.71 to 24.88), though she took gold in the 100 m (54.10, 2nd fastest all-time).

Le competed at the 1998 World Championships in Perth but only swam in relays. She recorded the slowest split (57.59) among all 32 swimmers in the 4×100 m free relay final, where the Chinese team placed 8th.

In 2000, Le made an attempt to qualify for her third Olympics but was off-form to make it into the team.

While Le had been Olympic champion and world champion many times, she had never won a medal at the Asian Games.  She competed in the 1994 Games in Hiroshima, entering the 50 m free and 4×100 m free relay.  In the 50 free, she set a Games record (25.26) in the heats but was disqualified in the final for a false start.  In the 4×100 m free relay, the Chinese team won (Le swam the 2nd leg and split 54.14) but was subsequently stripped of their gold when Lu Bin failed a doping test.

She was the face of the rising power of Chinese swimming in the mid-1990s. Due to her muscular build, she was one of many Chinese swimmers suspected of using steroids during the 1990s.  Though several others were later found guilty of doping, she never tested positive for any illegal substances.

See also
 World record progression 50 metres freestyle

External links
 Profile from official 2008 Summer Olympics Website
 Damning of Champions, SI.com, July 22, 1996 (archive)

1975 births
Living people
World record setters in swimming
Olympic gold medalists for China
Olympic silver medalists for China
Olympic swimmers of China
Swimmers from Shanghai
Swimmers at the 1992 Summer Olympics
Swimmers at the 1996 Summer Olympics
Chinese female freestyle swimmers
World Aquatics Championships medalists in swimming
Medalists at the FINA World Swimming Championships (25 m)
Medalists at the 1996 Summer Olympics
Medalists at the 1992 Summer Olympics
Olympic gold medalists in swimming
Olympic silver medalists in swimming
Universiade medalists in swimming
Universiade gold medalists for China
Medalists at the 1993 Summer Universiade
20th-century Chinese women
21st-century Chinese women